The Jewish Quarterly is an international Jewish publication that was based in the UK publication until 2021, the journal is now published by Australian publisher Morry Schwartz, With four issues released a year, The Jewish Quarterly focuses on issues of Jewish concern, but also has interests in wider culture and politics.

History and profile
The Jewish Quarterly was founded by Jacob Sonntag in 1953 and was published in the UK, through to its hiatus in 2019. In 2021, the publication was relaunched by Australian publisher, Morry Schwartz, for international distribution. The current editor is Jonathan Pearlman, who also edits Australian Foreign Affairs for Schwartz Media. Previous editors have included Matthew Reisz, Elena Lappin, and Rachel Shabi.

In 1974, Sonntag described the Jewish Quarterly:

References

External links
 https://jewishquarterly.com/ Official website
 
 Jewish Quarterly at Taylor & Francis
 https://www.thejc.com/news/uk/the-media-investor-relaunching-the-jq-1.509199

Literary magazines published in the United Kingdom
Quarterly magazines published in the United Kingdom
Cultural magazines published in the United Kingdom
Jewish magazines published in the United Kingdom
Magazines established in 1955
1955 establishments in the United Kingdom